The Senior Officers' School was a British military establishment established in 1916 by Brigadier-General R.J. Kentish for the training of Commonwealth senior officers of all services in inter-service cooperation. It was established as part of a wider attempt by the British Army to create a coherent training plan for its officers.

History
The School was originally intended for senior officers of the British Army who aspired to battalion command. It was taken as an affront by some senior officers of the day, who resented the implication—true in some cases—that they were incapable of delivering the necessary training. The School attempted to widen officers' outlook by including in its syllabus subjects that were not immediately military but led to an appreciation of the wider political, geographical and technological environment in which the British Army would operate.

The School was originally based at Aldershot but in the 1920s, it was transferred to Sheerness. In 1939 it moved to Erlestoke Park, a country house at Erlestoke, Wiltshire, where it continued to operate until June 1950 when a major fire caused it to move to the wings of the house; the school closed completely in 1961. The site was then converted into a detention centre for young offenders, and is now HM Prison Erlestoke.

There was also a parallel establishment, the Senior Officers' School, Belgaum, at Belgaum in India.

Notable alumni
 John Alan Lyde Caunter, Brigadier, British Army
 Andrew Cunningham, Admiral of the Fleet, Royal Navy
 Kenneth Leask, Air Vice-Marshal, Royal Air Force
 John Northcott, Lieutenant General, Australian Army
 Evered Poole, Major General, South African Army
 Anton Muttukumaru, Major General, Ceylon Army
 Edmond Schreiber, Lieutenant-General
 John Tovey, Admiral of the Fleet, Royal Navy
 John Tyssen, Air Commodore, Royal Air Force
 John Vereker, Field Marshal, British Army
 Douglas Wimberley, Major General, British Army
 Robert Nimmo, Lieutenant General, Australian Army

Commandants
The following officers commanded the school:
 Brigadier-General Charles E. Corkran: September 1919 – November 1921
 Brigadier-General Barnett D.L.G. Anley: November 1921 – November 1925
 Major-General Spencer E. Hollond: November 1925 – September 1927
 Brigadier Bertie D. Fisher: September 1927 – March 1930
 Major-General Andrew J. McCulloch: March 1930 – September 1933
 Brigadier Wilfred G. Lindsell: September 1933 – May 1935
 Brigadier Robert V. Pollok: May 1935 – May 1938
 Brigadier Roderic L. Petre: May 1938 – August 1939
 Brigadier Robert C. Money: August 1939 – June 1940
 Brigadier William Robb; June 1940 – March 1941
 Brigadier Piers D.W. Dunn: March – November 1941
 Brigadier D. Charles Bullen-Smith: November 1941 – May 1942
 Brigadier Stanley O. Jones: May 1942 – September 1943
 Brigadier James M.L. Renton: September 1943 – 1944
 (school closed 1944–1945)
 Brigadier Gerald E. Thubron: November 1945 – 1948
 Brigadier T. Patrick D. Scott: 1948 – May 1950
 Brigadier John M.K. Spurling: May 1950 – October 1953
 Brigadier Christopher B. Lipscomb: October 1953 – ??

References

External links
 Kent History Forum, Sheppey Army establishments

Training establishments of the British Army
Military schools in the United Kingdom
Military history of Wiltshire
Commandants of the Senior Officers' School, Sheerness